The ambassador of the United Kingdom to Ukraine is the United Kingdom's foremost diplomatic representative in Ukraine, and in charge of the UK's diplomatic mission in Kyiv. The position's official title is His Majesty's Ambassador Extraordinary and Plenipotentiary to Ukraine.

Ambassadors
 1992–1995: Simon Hemans
 1995–1999: Roy Reeve
 1999–2002: Roland Smith
 2002–2006: Robert Brinkley
 2006–2008: Timothy Barrow
 2008: Martin Harris chargé d'affaires March–June
 2008–2012: Leigh Turner
 2012–2015: Simon Smith

 2015–2019: Judith Gough</onlyinclude>
 2019–: Dame Melinda Simmons

See also 
 Embassy of the United Kingdom, Kyiv
 Embassy of Ukraine, London
 Ukraine–United Kingdom relations
 Ukraine–European Union relations

External links
 UK and Ukraine, gov.uk

References

Ukraine
 
United Kingdom ambassadors